Elizabeth Gwendolyn Proctor (born September 15, 1940) is an American politician who represented district 27A in the Maryland House of Delegates.

Background
Proctor's professional career was in education. She graduated from Frederick Douglass High School in Upper Marlboro and later attended Bowie State University, where she earned a bachelor's degree in education in 1962 and then a master's degree in special education in 1973. She worked as a special education teacher in the public schools of Prince George's County from 1962 to 1977. She also served as the head of the legislative committee of the Prince George's County Teacher's Association in 1999. The Proctors have two children; three grandchildren.

In the Legislature
Proctor was appointed by Maryland Governor Larry Hogan on October 9, 2015, to fill the seat in the Maryland House of Delegates left vacant by her husband's death. She was sworn in on October 30, 2015.

Committee assignments
 Member, Appropriations Committee, 2019–present (health & social services subcommittee, 2019; chair, oversight committee on pensions, 2021–present,member, 2019–present; capital budget subcommittee, 2020-; vice-chair, public safety & administration subcommittee, 2020–present; chair, oversight committee on pensions, 2021–present,member, 2019–present)
 Joint Committee on the Management of Public Funds, 2019–present
 Joint Audit and Evaluation Committee, 2021–present
 Member, Judiciary Committee, 2015–2018 (juvenile law subcommittee, 2016–2018)

Other memberships
 Member, Law Enforcement Committee, Prince George's County Delegation, 2017–present
 Member, Legislative Black Caucus of Maryland, 2015–present
 Member, Women Legislators of Maryland, 2015–present
 Member, Fire/EMS Caucus, 2017–present
 Member, Maryland Veterans Caucus, 2017–present

Political positions

Education
Proctor supports raising teacher wages and building new schools in Charles County. Like her husband, she supports proposals to build a recreation center in the southern part of Prince George's County.

In 2022, Proctor opposed legislation to break up the College of Southern Maryland to create a new Charles County Community College.

Social issues
In January 2019, Proctor voted in favor of legislation to lift a ban on developer contributions to candidates running in county executive and county council races in Prince George's County. She also voted in favor of legislation that would provide palliative care to terminally ill adults, which passed the House of Delegates by a vote of 74-66.

Electoral history

References

Democratic Party members of the Maryland House of Delegates
African-American state legislators in Maryland
1940 births
Bowie State University alumni
People from Prince George's County, Maryland
Living people
21st-century American politicians
21st-century American women politicians
21st-century African-American women
21st-century African-American politicians
20th-century African-American people
20th-century African-American women